This is a list of musicians who have contributed to the Arjen Anthony Lucassen's rock opera project known as Ayreon.

Vocals

Bass
Armand van der Hoff (ex-Bodine)
Jan Bijlsma (ex-Vengeance)
Jolanda Verduijn
Peter Vink (ex-Finch)
Rheno Xeros (ex-Bodine)
Walter Latupeirissa (Snowy White)
Johan van Stratum (Stream of Passion, Vuur)

Cello
Dewi Kerstens
Marieke van der Heyden
Taco Kooistra
Maaike Peterse (Kingfisher Sky)

Didgeridoo, Treble recorder
Jeroen Goossens

Drums
Ed Warby (Gorefest)
Ernst van Ee (Trenody)
Gerard Haitsma (ex-Bodine)
John Snels (ex-Vengeance)
Matt Oligschlager (ex-Vengeance)
Rob Snijders (ex-Celestial Season, Agua de Annique)
Stephen van Haestregt (ex-Within Temptation)

Flute
Barry Hay (Golden Earring)
Ewa Albering (ex-Quidam)
Jeroen Goossens (ex-Pater Moeskroen)
John McManus (Celtus)
Thijs van Leer (Focus)

Guitar
Gary Wehrkamp (Shadow Gallery)
Guthrie Govan (The Aristocrats, ex-Asia)
Jan Somers (Vengeance)
Joe Satriani (Chickenfoot)
Lori Linstruth
Marcel Coenen (Sun Caged)
Michael Romeo (Symphony X)
Oscar Holleman (ex-Vengeance)
Paul Gilbert (ex-Mr.Big, ex-Racer-X)
Peer Verschuren (ex-Vengeance)
Rheno Xeros (ex-Bodine)
Ruud Houweling (Cloudmachine)
Steve Hackett (ex-Genesis)

Hurdy-gurdy
Patty Gurdy

Keyboard / Harpsichord / Piano / Synths / Hammond
Cleem Determeijer (ex-Finch)
Clive Nolan (Arena)
Erik Norlander (Rocket Scientists)
Gary Wehrkamp (Shadow Gallery)
Derek Sherinian (Planet X, ex-Dream Theater)
Jordan Rudess (Dream Theater)
Joost van den Broek (After Forever)
Keiko Kumagai (Ars Nova)
Keith Emerson (Emerson, Lake & Palmer)
Ken Hensley (ex-Uriah Heep, ex-Blackfoot)
Mark Kelly (Marillion)
Martin Orford (IQ, Jadis)
Oliver Wakeman
René Merkelbach
Rick Wakeman (ex-Yes)
Robby Valentine (Valentine)
Roland Bakker (ex-Vengeance)
Tomas Bodin (The Flower Kings)
Ton Scherpenzeel (Kayak)

Sitar
Jack Pisters

Violin
Ernö Olah (Metropole Orchestra)
Pat McManus (Celtus)
Robert Baba
Ben Mathot

External links
 Official Ayreon Website

Guest musicians, list of Ayreon
Ayreon guest